Barkote is one of the largest blocks of the district Deogarh of the Indian State Odisha. Located on the bank of Bramhani River. It is the principal, commercial, cultural and Education centre of Deogarh. It was one of the oldest and reputed village of deogarh Now it is the major center for business. The population of this place with its suburbs is 12000. Many small villages constitutes this place like Danra, Basupali, Chakrapali, pichhula etc. This is the highest populous area of the district.

In the last 20th century after the creation of the rengali dam this place was created by the summation of small villages around the year 1985.

It is situated in the side of NH-6 which connect two major cities of India named as kolkota and Mumbai. The distance between this place and kolkota is 442 km and the distance between this place and Mumbai is 1552 km.

Geography

References

External links

Cities and towns in Debagarh district